Jiuzhai Huanglong Airport , also known as Jiuzhaigou Airport and Jiuhuang Airport, is an airport in Songpan County, Sichuan province, China.

It started flights on September 28, 2003, and has one runway of length  and width .

This should be taken into consideration when planning to fly into or out of Jiuzhai Huanglong airport. The first aid center at the airport has small canisters of oxygen and Tibetan herbal medicine for sale.

Airlines and destinations

As of June 2022, the airport is served by the following airlines.

See also
List of airports in China
List of highest airports

References

Airports in Sichuan
Ngawa Tibetan and Qiang Autonomous Prefecture